Dmitri Bezus (Ukrainian: Дмитро Безус; born March 19, 1989), also spelled as Dmytro Bezus, is a Ukrainian heavyweight professional boxer and kickboxer, managed by WKN Top Team. As a kickboxer, Bezus has fought for Kunlun Fight, Glory, and K-1. 

In 2019, Bezus began his professional boxing career.

Titles
Professional Kickboxing
2014 Kunlun Fight Heavyweight Tournament Runner-Up  
2014 Chauss'Fight Savate Professional World Champion 
2012 Thai Fight Heavyweight Tournament Runner-Up 
2011 UAMA Shoot-Fight Rules Tournament Champion 

Amateur Muay Thai
2013 WMF World Thaiboxing Championship 
2011 IFMA World Thaiboxing Championship (Uzbekistan) 
2010 IFMA European Thaiboxing Championship (Turkey) 
2009 IFMA World Thaiboxing Championship (Thailand)

Kickboxing record

|-
|-  bgcolor="#c5d2ea"
| 2015-09-26 || Draw ||align=left| Maxim Bolotov || KOK World GP 2015 - Heavyweight Tournament || Chisinau, Moldova || Draw || 3 || 3:00
|-
|-  bgcolor="#FFBBBB"
| 2014-10-18 || Loss ||align=left| Grégory Tony || Choc Fight Night || Draguignan, France ||  Decision (Unanimous) || 5 || 3:00
|-
! style=background:white colspan=9 |
|- 
|-  bgcolor="#FFBBBB"
| 2014-06-29 || Loss ||align=left| Andrei Gerasimchuk || Kunlun Fight 6, Semi Finals  || Chongqing, China ||Decision (Unanimous) || 3||3:00
|-
! style=background:white colspan=9 |
|- 
|-  bgcolor="#CCFFCC"
| 2014-06-29 ||Win ||align=left| Mikhail Tyuterev || Kunlun Fight 6, Semi Finals  || Chongqing, China ||Decision (Unanimous) || 3||3:00
|-
|-  bgcolor="#FFBBBB"  
| 2014-03-08 || Loss ||align=left| Benjamin Adegbuyi || GLORY 14 || Zagreb, Croatia || TKO (referee stoppage) || 2 || 1:53 
|-
|-  bgcolor="#CCFFCC"
| 2014-01-11 || Win ||align=left| Jan Siersema || Chauss'Fight  || France ||  ||  || 
|-
! style=background:white colspan=9 |
|- 
|-  bgcolor="#FFBBBB"
| 2013-02-22 || Loss ||align=left| Valentin Slavikovski || Knockout Show || Moscow, Russia || Decision (Split) || 3 || 3:00
|-
|-  bgcolor="#FFBBBB"
| 2012-12-16 ||Loss ||align=left| Patrice Quarteron || Thai Fight 2012 Heavyweight Tournament, Final || Bangkok, Thailand || Decision|| 3||3:00
|-
! style=background:white colspan=9 |
|-
|-  bgcolor="#CCFFCC"
| 2012-12-16 ||Win ||align=left| James Kouame || Thai Fight 2012 Heavyweight Tournament, Semi Finals || Bangkok, Thailand || || 3||
|-
|-  bgcolor="#FFBBBB"
| 2012-11-10 || Loss ||align=left| Tomáš Hron || SUPERKOMBAT World Grand Prix 2012 Final Elimination || Craiova, Romania || DQ (Illegal Spinning Elbow) || 3 || N/A
|-
|-  bgcolor="#FFBBBB"
| 2012-09-29 || Loss ||align=left| Tomasz Szczepkowski || KOK World GP 2012 in Chișinău - Lightweight Tournament, Super Fight  || Chișinău, Moldova || Decision || 3  || 3:00 
|-
|-  bgcolor="#FFBBB"
| 2012-05-26 || Loss ||align=left| Tomáš Hron || Profiliga Muaythai 12 || Slovakia || Decision (Unanimous) || 3 || 3:00
|-
|-  bgcolor="#CCFFCC"
| 2012-01-21 || Win ||align=left| Oleg Zablodskiy || Tatneft Arena World Cup 2012 2nd selection 1/8 final (+91 kg) || Kazan, Russia || TKO (Liver Punch) || 1||  0:55
|-
|-  bgcolor="#FFBBBB"
| 2011-11-12 || Loss ||align=left| Hicham Ashalhi || Tatneft Arena World Cup 2011 Final (+80 kg)  || Kazan, Russia || Decision (Unanimous) || 6 || 3:00
|-
! style=background:white colspan=9 |
|-
|-  bgcolor="#CCFFCC"
| 2011-07-23 || Win ||align=left| Yuri Dobko || Tatneft Arena World Cup 2011 Semifinal (+80 kg) || Kazan, Russia || KO (Lowkick) || 2 || 2:52
|-
|-  bgcolor="#CCFFCC"
| 2011-05-28 || Win ||align=left| Ricardo Christian || Tatneft Arena World Cup 2011 2nd selection 1/4 final (+80 kg) || Kazan, Russia || Decision (Unanimous) || 4 || 3:00
|-
|-  bgcolor="#CCFFCC"
| 2011-02-12 || Win ||align=left| Humberto Evora || Tatneft Arena World Cup 2011 3rd selection 1/8 final (+80 kg) || Kazan, Russia || RTD (Broken Leg) || 1 || 0:30
|-
|-  bgcolor="#CCFFCC"
| 2011-01-28 || Win ||align=left| Anton Chuvasov || UAMA: Warrior's Honor 5, Final || Kharkov, Ukraine  || KO (Low Kick) || || 
|-
! style=background:white colspan=9 |
|-
|-  bgcolor="#CCFFCC"
| 2011-01-28 || Win ||align=left| Andrey Osadchiy || UAMA: Warrior's Honor 5, Semi Finals || Kharkov, Ukraine  || Decision || ||
|-
|-  bgcolor="#FFBBBB"
| 2010-12-29 || Loss ||align=left| Zamig Athakishiyev || RMO Istanbul 2010, Semi Finals|| Istanbul, Turkey ||  Decision || 3 || 3:00
|-
|-  bgcolor="#FFBBBB"
| 2010-12-29 || Loss ||align=left| Zabit Samedov || RMO Istanbul 2010, Quarter Finals  || Istanbul, Turkey || Ext. R. Decision || 4 || 3:00
|-
|-  bgcolor="#FFBBBB"
| 2010-04-30 || Loss ||align=left| Ramazan Ramazanov || Tatneft Arena World Cup 2010 1st selection 1/4 final (+80 kg) || Kazan, Russia || Decision (Unanimous) || 3 || 3:00
|-
|-  bgcolor="#FFBBBB"
| 2010-03-28 || Loss ||align=left| Tomasz Sarara || K-1 World Grand Prix 2010 in Warsaw, Semi Finals|| Warsaw, Poland || Ext.R. Decision || 3 || 3:00
|-
|-  bgcolor="#CCFFCC"
| 2010-03-28 || Win ||align=left| Rowan Tol || K-1 World Grand Prix 2010 in Warsaw, Quarter Finals || Warsaw, Poland || Ext.R. Decision || 3 || 3:00
|-
|-  bgcolor="#CCFFCC"
| 2010-01-31 || Win ||align=left| Elvin Abbasov || Tatneft Arena World Cup 2010 2nd selection 1/8 final (+80 kg) || Kazan, Russia || KO (Backfist) || 3 || 
|-
|-  bgcolor="#FFBBBB"
| 2009-05-23 || Loss ||align=left| Sergei Lascenko || K-1 World Grand Prix 2009 in Łódź, Semi Finals || Łódź, Poland || TKO (referee stoppage) || 1 || 2:29
|-
|-  bgcolor="#CCFFCC"
| 2009-05-23 || Win ||align=left| Wieslaw Kwasniewski || K-1 World Grand Prix 2009 in Łódź, Reserve Fight || Łódź, Poland ||  Ext.R. Decision (Split) || 4 || 3:00
|-
|-  bgcolor="#CCFFCC"
| 2007-10-20 || Win ||align=left| Konstantin Gluhov || Kickboxing World Cup || Yalta, Ukraine || Decision || 3 || 3:00
|-
|-
| colspan=9 | Legend:    

|-  style="background:#fbb;"
| 2011-09-25|| Loss||align=left| Aliaksei Kudzin|| 2011 IFMA World Championships, Semi Finals || Tashkent, Uzbekistan || Decision || 4 || 2:00
|-
! style=background:white colspan=9 |

|-  style="background:#cfc;"
| 2009-12-||Win||align=left| Nadyr Gadzhiev || 2009 IFMA World Championships, Final || Bangkok, Thailand || Decision || 4 || 2:00
|-
! style=background:white colspan=9 |

|-  style="background:#cfc;"
| 2009-12-|| Win ||align=left| || 2009 IFMA World Championships, Semi Finals || Bangkok, Thailand || Decision || 4 || 2:00
|-
| colspan=9 | Legend:

Professional boxing record

See also
 List of K-1 events
 List of K-1 champions
 List of male kickboxers

References

External links

Profile at FightLife.ru

1989 births
Living people
Ukrainian male kickboxers
Ukrainian male boxers
Heavyweight kickboxers
Ukrainian Muay Thai practitioners
Kunlun Fight kickboxers
SUPERKOMBAT kickboxers
Heavyweight boxers
Sportspeople from Kharkiv